Jim Lambert (born September 2, 1966) is an American sportswriter. He has covered sports for The Star-Ledger newspaper in New Jersey since 1989. During his career, Lambert has been one of the authorities in high school track & field. Lambert was referred to as "the gold standard" of high school track & field journalism in New Jersey by NJ Runners.com. Lambert was honored by the New Jersey State Interscholastic Athletic Association (NJSIAA) in 2002 and 2016 as the Sportswriter of the Year in New Jersey.

In addition to his work for The Star-Ledger, Lambert has been published in High School Runner Magazine. Lambert is a 1984 graduate of Scotch Plains-Fanwood High School (N.J.) and received a Bachelor of Arts degree from East Stroudsburg University (Pa.) in 1989. He resides in Fanwood, New Jersey with his wife, Janet, and two daughters, Rachel and Jennifer.

References

2. http://wawa.starledger.com/texis/search/+cfeA7X7eVDbnmjeUhYcwwwx/search.html. Retrieved on 2009-07-12

1966 births
Living people
American sportswriters
East Stroudsburg University of Pennsylvania alumni
People from Fanwood, New Jersey
Scotch Plains-Fanwood High School alumni